The Puriri River is a river of the Waikato Region of New Zealand's North Island.

73% of the catchment is in forest and 27% in pasture. The main tributaries are Apakura, Kotorepupuai and Matangiharara streams. Average channel gradients are 5% to 7%.

Macroinvertebrate levels in the stream indicate a good water quality. The stream is used for water supply.

Radiocarbon dating of shell middens beside the river indicates the earliest settlement along the river was about 1674.

See also
Puriri, New Zealand
List of rivers of New Zealand

References

Thames-Coromandel District
Rivers of Waikato
Rivers of New Zealand
Hauraki Gulf catchment